Montmelard is a commune in the department of Saône-et-Loire in France.

See also
Communes of the Saône-et-Loire department

References

Communes of Saône-et-Loire